Michael F. Smith is an American politician. He is a Republican member of the Delaware House of Representatives, representing District 22. In 2018, he won the Republican primary with 64 percent of the vote. He went on to win the general election by 140 votes, with 5,955 votes total (50.6%) against Democratic nominee Guillermina Gonzalez.

References

External links
Official page at the Delaware General Assembly
 

Living people
University of Delaware alumni
Republican Party members of the Delaware House of Representatives
21st-century American politicians
Year of birth missing (living people)